The Anizon VOCALOOP is a series of vocal loop sequencer with a Vocaloid chip. It is developed by Tokyo based project team Anizon.

About 
VOCALOOP was originally planned by Shota Kagami who was one of the inventors of Vocaloid Keyboard, also uses NSX-1 chip "eVY1", a LSI sound generator developed by Yamaha. The first protype appeared on some Japanese media in March 2014. The prototype was showcased at Experimental Electronic Event by Cobalt Bomb Alpha Omega and Electronic Music Lab, National University of Singapore and Japan Techno Showcase in Japan Expo, Paris, France, 2014.

References

External links 
  

Vocaloid